Saman Aghazamani (born January 14, 1989) ) is a retired Iranian footballer who last played for Aluminium Arak and Perspolis among other clubs in Persian Gulf Pro League.

He has played for Saipa Tehran, Persepolis Tehran,  Rah Ahan , Ararat Yerevan, Saba Qom, Naft Tehran.

Aghazamani was born in Tehran and participated in Iranian youth teams and Omid Iran.

Club career
He started his professional career with Saipa and moved to Persepolis June 2009 and was used as defensive midfielder, right back. He extended his contract with Persepolis for three years, kepping him in the team till 2015.

On 13 January 2014, Aghazamani joined Rah Ahan with signing a two-and-half-year contract.

Club career statistics
Last Update:  10 May 2016

International career
Aghazamani is also part of Iran U23. He was captain of Iran U20.

Honours
Persepolis
Hazfi Cup: 2009–10, 2010–11

References

External links 
 Saman Aghazamani at PersianLeague.com
 

1989 births
Saipa F.C. players
Persepolis F.C. players
Rah Ahan players
Iranian expatriate footballers
Living people
Iranian footballers
Association football fullbacks
Association football midfielders